Arthur J. Broadhurst (born September 28, 1964) is an American politician who represented the 15th Essex district in the Massachusetts House of Representatives from 1993 to 2007. He  was a candidate for Essex County Register of Deeds in 2006, but lost in the Democratic primary.

References

1964 births
Salem State University alumni
Massachusetts School of Law alumni
Massachusetts School of Law faculty
Democratic Party members of the Massachusetts House of Representatives
People from Methuen, Massachusetts
Living people